The 1910 Svenska Mästerskapet Final was played on 16 October 1910 between the second-time finalists IFK Göteborg and the four-time finalists Djurgårdens IF. The match decided the winner of 1910 Svenska Mästerskapet, the football cup to determine the Swedish champions. IFK Göteborg won their second title with a 3–0 victory.

Route to the final

IFK Göteborg 

In the preliminary round, IFK Göteborg was drawn against Rantens IF. The match on 21 August 1910 was abandoned at 3–1, and continued one week later, on 28 August 1910, where IFK Göteborg won 10–1 in Gothenburg. On 4 September 1910, IFK Göteborg beat Helsingborgs IF, 6–1, in the away-game quarter-final in Helsingborg. IFK Göteborg played a Kamratmöte semi-final against IFK Norrköping at home in Gothenburg on 25 September 1910 and won, 7–1.

IFK Göteborg made their second appearance in a Svenska Mästerskapet final, having won their previous in 1908.

Djurgårdens IF 

On 21 August 1910, Djurgårdens entered the preliminary round with a 2–0 away-game win against Örgryte IS in Gothenburg. Djurgården then won the quarter-final against IFK Uppsala at home in Stockholm with 2–0 on 4 September 1910. On 25 September 1910, Djurgården beat IFK Köping in the semi-final at home, 4–0.

Djurgården made their fourth Svenska Mästerskapet final after having lost in all their three previous appearances, the 1904, 1906 and 1909 finals to Örgryte IS.

Match details

References 

Print

1910
1910 in Swedish football
IFK Göteborg matches
Football in Gothenburg
Djurgårdens IF Fotboll matches
October 1910 sports events
Sports competitions in Gothenburg
1910s in Gothenburg